Wardill is a surname. Notable people with the surname include:

Benjamin Wardill (1842–1917), Australian cricketer and cricket administrator 
Dick Wardill (1872–1929), Australian rules footballer and coach
Emily Wardill (born 1977), British artist and filmmaker
Joe Wardill (born 1997), British rugby league footballer
Richard Wardill (1840–1873), Australian cricketer